Lake Qaraoun ( / ALA-LC: Buḥayrat al-Qara‘ūn) is an artificial lake or reservoir located in the southern region of the Beqaa Valley, Lebanon. It was created near Qaraoun village in 1959 by building a  concrete-faced rockfill dam (the largest dam in Lebanon) in the middle reaches of the Litani River (longest river in Lebanon).

During the dry season,  of water is diverted from Markaba power station to meet the needs of the Kassmieh irrigation project.

The lake is a habitat for some 20,000 migratory birds which visit it annually.

Geography

Note 420 million cubic meters is approximately 15 billion cubic feet or approximately 340,000 acre feet.

The Litani River drains the southern end of the Beqaa Valley plains (a continuation of the Jordan Rift Valley), crossing the southern periphery of the Mount Lebanon range and discharging into the sea north of Tyre, after traversing a length of  entirely in Lebanon. The hydrographical system of Lebanon consisting of 40 major streams is typecast into five regions, which includes the Litani River Basin formed by the Litani River in its eastern and southern part, with the river debouching into the sea at the southwestern end. The artificial lake is created across the Litani River in its middle reaches. Litani River is the longest river in Lebanon at the southern end of the Beqaa valley.

The Litani River, which lies entirely within the territory of Lebanon rises near the historic city of Baalbek (now the site hardly discernible due to high rate of water extraction in this reach for pumping and ancient city development) and flows through for  before it outlets into the Mediterranean Sea. It is one of the 40 major streams in Lebanon and is the longest from the source to the Mediterranean Sea.

The land on the periphery of the reservoir consists of agricultural lands on the eastern side where arable crops and olive orchards are seen. Grazing of sheep and goats is also noted. On the steep sloping western periphery of the lake there are fruit orchards and pasture land for grazing.

Geology
The geological formation at the dam axis and the reservoir consists of limestone, chalky marl, and alluvial deposits with semi karstic and karstic limestones both upstream of the reservoir area and along the dam axis. Marl in the reservoir area has low permeability.

Climate
The climate in the catchment of the reservoir is of continental type with 90% of rainfall occurring between November and April, with January experiencing the maximum precipitation. Snowfall is experienced at elevation above .

Water resources and hydroelectric power plants

The average annual flow received at the reservoir is utilised through the dam created at the site and diverting it through a series of tunnels and ponds to generate 600 GWh of energy at three hydroelectric power stations ( total installed capacity) located at Markaba, Awali and Jun. The planning done in the 1950s at the time of building the dam and the Qaraoun reservoir envisaged utilization of  head available between the dam and the Mediterranean Sea through the three power stations. The river outlet at the end of the cascade of power plants is now  to the north of its original outlet.

It is the first of three hydro power stations that generate energy from the water of Lake Qaroun. The total power supply of the Ibrahim Abdel Al station is 36 MW generated by two power generation units.

The Paul Arcache hydroelectric power plant is the biggest hydroelectric plant in Lebanon, with an overall power supply of 108 MW. It was established in 1965. The plant also draws water from the Qaroun lake after it comes out of the Abdel Al plant through a  tunnel where its joined by water from different springs and streams such as Ain el Zarqa and Nahr el Cheta.

The plant uses the water dropping from a  altitude from the Awali basin located at the lower end of the Paul Arcache plant. The basin takes water discharged from the Paul Arcache plant and from Bisri river.

As result of this development the hydrological regime of the Litani River has been divided into two zones. The basin above the lake is known as the Upper Litani Basin (ULB), and that below the lake is called Litani's lower reaches.

Reservoir

The power generation is a primary benefit, which meets about 7%–10% of the power requirements in Lebanon.

During 1999–2000, the water quality of the reservoir has been investigated from 16 sampling points on the river and its tributaries, by the Ministry of Environment and the Litani River Authority as a part of an exercise to evolve management plan for the Litani River and Lake Qaroun's catchment. It has been noted that seven sewer networks drain directly into the river. Untreated sewage from the towns of Baalbek, Houch el Rafqa, Qaa er Rim, Zahle, Chtoura, Qabb Elias, Bar Elias, Joub Jannine and Qaraoun flow into the Litani River or its tributaries, apart from industrial effluents many factories related to manufacture of sugar, paper, lead, limestone crushers, agro-industries and also from  poultry farms, tanneries and slaughterhouses. The pollution is noted by the high recorded values of BOD5 (79 mg/L) and nitrates (1.7 mg/L) in the Litani River.

The vegetation in the periphery of the lake consists of woodland, orchards, and low-growing scrub. During water-level variations in the lake, as the stored water is utilised for various beneficial uses, no submerged or emergent vegetation have been noticed. When the water level is at its lowest in the lake, a steppe-like land slope has been noticed with low vegetation of rocky shingle terrain where flocks of larks and lapwings are seen.

The bird life in the reservoir area is very notable, as 20,000 migratory birds of species of raptors, storks, pelicans and others species of birds have been sighted. The ferruginous duck (Aythya nyroca), pallid harrier (Circus macrourus), greater spotted eagle (Aquila clanga), eastern imperial eagle (Aquila heliaca) and sociable lapwing (Vanellus gregarius) are some of the birds which are of conservation concern, according to the 2008 IUCN Red List.

El Qaroun Dam

The dam had been under planning since 1964.

Future developments
The lake water is proposed to be integrated with a pumped-storage scheme planned under the "Qaraoun Lake-Marj et Taouil: Project".

Archaeology
The archaeological site of Ain Jaouze overlooks Lake Qaraoun at the foot of Jebel Baruk on the west of the road from Chtaura to Jezzine. Jesuit archaeologist, Auguste Bergy collected flints from the surface of this site, suggested to be similar to those of later neolithic Byblos.

Visitor attractions
On the western periphery of the lake there are many restaurants and hotels which are popular during late spring and summer. During this time many large boats operate in the lake for lake viewing and also for fishing. In winter, when water level in the lake is high boats are operated to hunt for of birds such as wildfowl, mainly storks, heron, egrets and lark species.

References

Qaraoun
Neolithic settlements
Archaeological sites in Lebanon
Tourist attractions in Lebanon
Beqaa Valley